Posidonius or Poseidonios may refer to:

Poseidonios the Macedonian (3rd century BC?), a siege engineer mentioned by Biton of Pergamon
Posidonius (1st century BC), Stoic polymath

Posidonius (bishop of Urgell), bishop between AD 814 and 823
Posidonius (crater), a lunar impact crater